UTAC may refer to:

 UTAC Group, a provider of test and assembly services for a wide range of semiconductor devices based in Singapore
 , a member of the French AFNOR group of standardization bodies
 University of Toronto Art Centre, a public gallery at the University of Toronto